The 1950 Yugoslav First Basketball League season is the 6th season of the Yugoslav First Basketball League, the highest professional basketball league in SFR Yugoslavia.

Regular season

League table

Winning Roster  
The winning roster of Crvena Zvezda:
  Nebojša Popović
  Milan Bjegojević
  Ladislav Demšar
  Strahinja Alagić
  Aleksandar Gec
  Milorad Sokolović
  Srđan Kalember
  Borislav Ćurčić
  Dimitrije Krstić
  Tullio Rochlitzer
  Borko Jovanović
  Đorđe Andrijašević
  Stevan Aleksić

Coach:  Nebojša Popović

External links  
 Yugoslav First Basketball League Archive 

1950